MDC is an American punk rock band formed in 1979 in Austin, Texas, subsequently based in San Francisco, and currently Portland, Oregon. Among the first wave of bands to define the sound and style of American hardcore punk, MDC originally formed as The Stains; they have periodically changed the meaning of "MDC", the most frequent being Millions of Dead Cops. The band's lyrical content expresses radical left political views and has proven influential within the punk subculture.

MDC released material through ex-Dead Kennedys singer Jello Biafra's independent label Alternative Tentacles. In the 1990s, vocalist Dave Dictor published editorials for the internationally distributed fanzine Maximumrocknroll. MDC's initial run ended in 1995, and the band spent five years on hiatus, before returning in 2000 with some new band members.

Career

Early years
Formed in the late 1970s as The Stains and playing their first gig under this name in August 1980, MDC were one of three pioneering hardcore punk bands in Austin, Texas, in the early '80s, alongside The Dicks and Big Boys. These bands frequently played together and established the Austin hardcore scene. They released one single as The Stains in 1981, featuring a slower version of the future MDC song "John Wayne Was a Nazi" backed with "Born to Die". Both songs were later released on the debut MDC album.

1980s
By 1982 the band had relocated to San Francisco, California, and renamed themselves MDC. By this point the band were active participants in the growing hardcore scene and released their debut LP Millions of Dead Cops on their own label, R Radical; Jello Biafra's Alternative Tentacles helped with distribution. The album is now widely considered a punk classic, and features songs such as "John Wayne Was a Nazi", "Dick for Brains", and the harsh criticism of the police, "I Remember". Other targets of criticism devoid of irony included capitalism ("Corporate Death Burger"), homophobia ("America's So Straight"), and American culture ("Violent Rednecks").

During the summer of 1982 they became involved in the Rock Against Reagan Tour, during which time they fell out with the band Bad Brains when Rastafarian singer H.R. learned that Big Boys' singer, Randy Turner, was gay. H.R. and MDC's Dave Dictor had an intense confrontation. Upon Bad Brains' departure from the bill, they refused to return a loan owed to Big Boys and instead left a note that reportedly read "burn in hell bloodclot faggot". The incident resulted in the MDC song "Pay to Come Along". For MDC, 1982 ended with a tour of Europe with the Dead Kennedys which brought the band greater exposure in the punk scene outside of the U.S., especially in the UK.

Name change
In 1983 the band began to deemphasize the "Dead Cops" aspect of its name, as drummer Al Schvitz noted in a Flipside interview:

Their involvement in the Rock Against Reagan activities continued through 1983 and they returned to recording with the EP "Multi-Death Corporations" which was distributed in the UK by British anarcho-punk label Crass Records and R Radical in the U.S. The EP broke new ground by addressing, in the lengthy liner notes and artwork, the growth of corporations and the violent suppression of left-wing politics in Central America. In 1984 they released another EP, Millions of Dead Children (also known as Chicken Squawk), this time dealing with vegetarian and vegan issues via a cowpunk tune.

Iconoclastic punk rock cartoonist John Crawford, an outspoken critic of the band, was cynical in his assessment of the alteration of the band's initial name, which he characterized as "stupid" and "inflammatory." Crawford intimated that the name change had been opportunistic:

Smoke Signals was released in 1986, their second album featuring a more diverse style than previously, with a foray into '70s rock with the song "South Africa Is Free". This album also saw Gordon Fraser's first appearance as main guitarist. In the same year, MDC backed Michelle Shocked on a version of her song "Fogtown" that appears as a hidden track on her breakthrough album, Short Sharp Shocked.

Their third album, This Blood's for You, followed in 1987 and saw them continuing to showcase orthodox hardcore punk style and classic rock, including a cover of the Cream song "Politician". Themes again included intervention in Central America and criticism of the Reagan Administration. MDC toured Europe in 1988, where the live album Elvis - In the Rhineland was recorded. The band released the album Metal Devil Cokes in 1989 with guitar player Eric Calhoun and bassist Joe Strom.

1990s
The 1990s opened with a number of lineup changes, swiftly followed by the 1991 album Hey Cop! If I Had a Face Like Yours ... , featuring Bill Collins (formerly of Fang, Special Forces, Intensified Chaos) on guitar and Matt Freeman (of Operation Ivy and Rancid) on bass. Collins wrote all the music on the album and sang three of the songs. This lineup toured the US and Europe. The acclaimed Shades of Brown album appeared in 1993, released by New Red Archives in the U.S. and We Bite in Europe. The album featured the hip hop vegetarian song "Real Food, Real People, Real Bullets". MDC, now with guitarist Chris Wilder (formerly of Stikky) and bassist Erica Liss, marked the album with a tour of the former Soviet Union, making MDC the first American punk band to tour Russia. This was followed by two more European tours and several U.S. tours until 1995, where began a lull in the band's activity. The lack of new recorded material, other than a 7-inch release on Slap-a-Ham Records, and live performances after 1994, plus personal problems of band members, pointed to an informal break-up of the band.

2000s
MDC's singer, Dave Dictor, returned with an entirely new backing line-up in 2000, which included Long Island musicians Matt Van Cura (bass), Erik Mischo (guitar), and John Soldo (Drums). MDC released a new album, Magnus Dominus Corpus, in 2004. They took part in a 25th anniversary world tour in 2005, with an all-original lineup. Following the death of Mikey Donaldson in September 2007, MDC has been touring the U.S. and Europe extensively with the Dictor/Posner/Smith/Schvitz lineup.

Recently, the band has been based in Portland, Oregon.

In November 2016, MDC released a video for the forthcoming release of a new recording of "Born to Die", made to protest the Donald Trump presidential campaign. The song's slogan "No Trump, no KKK, no fascist USA" was reported to be heard at anti-Trump demonstrations in Chicago. At the 2016 American Music Awards on November 20, the band Green Day adopted the anti-Trump slogan for a controversial impromptu chant during their live on-air performance, which Dictor applauded and encouraged. The media spotlight Green Day's action put on MDC inspired the band to create new material based around the current political climate. The album, entitled Mein Trumpf, was released in 2017.

Members

Current lineup
Vocals – Dave Dictor (1979–1995, 2000–present)
Guitar – Russ Kalita (2008–present)
Guitar – Barry d'live Ward (2017-present)
Bass – Mike Smith (2007–present)
Drums - Al Schvitz (1979-1995, 2008-2019, 2021-present)

Former members 
Guitar – Ron Posner (1979–1986)(2002–2016)
Guitar – Gordon Fraser (1986–1987)
Guitar – Eric Calhoun (1987–1990)
Guitar – Bill Collins (1990–1992)(2016–2017)
Guitar – Chris Wilder (1992–1995)
Guitar – Erik Mischo (2000)
Guitar – Brendan Bekowies (2001–2002)
Bass – Michael Donaldson (1979–1982, 2003–2007; died 2007)
Bass – Franco Mares (1982–1990)
Bass – Matt Freeman (1990–1992)
Bass – Erica Liss (1992–1995)
Bass – Matt Van Cura (2000–2002)
Drums – Al Batross (2000–2002)
Drums – Mike Pride (2002–2005)
Drums – Dejan Podobnik (2006–2007)
Drums – Felix Griffin (2008)

Timeline

Discography

Singles/EPs
Stains - "John Wayne was a Nazi" 7", R Radical Records, 1980
Millions of Dead Cops - "John Wayne was a Nazi" 7", R Radical Records, 1981
Multi-Death Corporations - "Multi-Death Corporations" EP, Crass Records, 1983
Millions of Dead Children - "Chicken Squawk" EP, R Radical Records, 1984

Albums
Millions of Dead Cops (1982)
Smoke Signals (1986)
This Blood's for You (1987)
Metal Devil Cokes (1989)
Hey Cop!!! If I Had A Face Like Yours... (1991)
Shades of Brown (1993)
Magnus Dominus Corpus (2004)
Mein Trumpf (2017)
Millions of Dead Cowboys (2020)

Splits
Millions of Dead Cops / Capitalist Casualties Liberty Gone EP Split 7", Slap a Ham, 1994
Millions of Dead Cops / Pig Champion Split 7", Honest Don's, 1997
MDC/Poison Idea split, 2004
Millions of Dead Cops / John The Baker Split (MDC EP)|Millions of Dead Cops - John The Baker Acoustic Split 7", Tank Crimes, 2006
Millions of Dead Cops / Potbelly Split 7", PB/Crash Assailant, 2008
Millions of Dead Cops / Riot Cop Split CD, Malarie, 2008
Millions of Dead Cops / The Restarts Split LP/CD, No Label Records, 2009
Millions of Dead Cops / Carburetor Dung / The Bollocks - "MABUKKUASA" Split-CD, S.B.S/Jerk Off Records, 2011
Millions of Dead Cops / Attentat Sonore Split 7", Guerilla Vinyl / Campary / Fillferro / Tupatutupa Records, October 2011.
MDC (Acoustic) / Naked Aggression / Raw Power / Som Hi Noise - "No More Borders", Split 7", Jailhouse/Sixty Nine Apples Records, 2012

Live recordings
MDC - Elvis In The Rheinland: Live In Berlin LP, R Radical Records, 1989
MDC - Live In Maribor LP, 1990
MDC - Live At CBGB's 1983, Beer City Records BCR190-1, 2015 (Limited to 1000 copies, on translucent green vinyl)

Compilations
 International P.E.A.C.E. Benefit Compilation (R Radical Records, 1984)
 Rat Music for Rat People, Vol. 2 (CD Presents, 1984)
 Millions of Dead Cops - More Dead Cops LP, 1988 (Compilation of EPs)
 Hardcore Breakout USA Volume 2 (New Red Archives, 1995)
 The Punk, The Bad & The Ugly (Cleopatra, 1997)
 At War With Society (New Red Archives, 1998)
 At War With Society II (New Red Archives, 1999)
 Millions of Dead Cops - Now More Than Ever LP, 2002 (Best Of Compilation)
 Solid EP 7" (Crash Assailant, 2008)
 Human EP 7" (Rodent Popsicle/ Crash Assailant, 2009)
 Hardcore Breakout - Essential Punk (New Red Archives, 2012)
 Punk For Ukraine Vol. 1 (Grimace, 2022) - "Mein Trumpf"

References

External links
MDC on Facebook
MDC Punk website
x-con ron MDC Rocks
Flipside Interview - MDC interview from 1982
Maximumrocknroll Interview - MDC interview from 1983
Suburban Voice Interview - MDC interview from 1983

Hardcore punk groups from Texas
Musical groups established in 1979
Musical groups from Portland, Oregon
Musical groups from Austin, Texas
1981 establishments in Texas
Political music groups
Boner Records artists